Ahmed Hassan Zewail (February 26, 1946 — August 2, 2016) was an Egyptian-American chemist, known as the "father of femtochemistry". He was awarded the 1999 Nobel Prize in Chemistry for his work on femtochemistry and became the first Egyptian to win a Nobel Prize in a scientific field, and the second African to win a Nobel Prize in Chemistry. He was the Linus Pauling Chair Professor of Chemistry, Professor of Physics, and the director of the Physical Biology Center for Ultrafast Science and Technology at the California Institute of Technology.'Early life and education
Ahmed Hasan Zewail was born on February 26, 1946, in Damanhur, Egypt, and was raised in Desouk. He received a Bachelor of Science and Master of Science degrees in Chemistry from Alexandria University before moving to the United States to complete his PhD at the University of Pennsylvania supervised by Robin M. Hochstrasser.

Career

After completing his PhD, Zewail did postdoctoral research at the University of California, Berkeley, supervised by Charles Bonner Harris. Following this, he was awarded a faculty appointment at the California Institute of Technology in 1976, and he made the first Linus Pauling Chair in Chemical Physics. He became a naturalized citizen of the United States on March 5, 1982. Zewail was the director of the Physical Biology Center for Ultrafast Science and Technology at the California Institute of Technology.

Zewail had been nominated and participated in President Barack Obama's Presidential Council of Advisors on Science and Technology (PCAST), an advisory group of the nation's leading scientists and engineers to advise the President and Vice President and formulate policy in the areas of science, technology, and innovation.

Research
Zewail's key work was a pioneer of femtochemistry—i.e. the study of chemical reactions across femtoseconds. Using a rapid ultrafast laser technique (consisting of ultrashort laser flashes), the technique allows the description of reactions on very short time scales – short enough to analyse transition states in selected chemical reactions. Zewail became known as the "father of femtochemistry".

Political work
In a speech at Cairo University on June 4, 2009, US President Barack Obama proclaimed a new Science Envoy program as part of a "new beginning between the United States and Muslims around the world." In January 2010, Ahmed Zewail, Elias Zerhouni, and Bruce Alberts became the first US science envoys to Islam, visiting Muslim-majority countries from North Africa to Southeast Asia.

When asked about rumors that he might contest the 2011 Egyptian presidential election, Ahmed Zewail said: "I am a frank man... I have no political ambition, as I have stressed repeatedly that I only want to serve Egypt in the field of science and die as a scientist."

During the 2011 Egyptian protests he announced his return to the country. Zewail said that he would join a committee for constitutional reform alongside Ayman Nour, Mubarak's rival at the 2005 presidential elections and a leading lawyer.
Zewail was later mentioned as a respected figure working as an intermediary between the military regime ruling after Mubarak's resignation, and revolutionary youth groups such as the April 6 Youth Movement and young supporters of Mohamed ElBaradei. He played a critical role during this time as described by Egyptian Media.

Awards and honors
In 1999, Zewail became the first Egyptian to receive a science Nobel Prize when he was awarded the Nobel Prize in Chemistry. Zewail gave his Nobel Lecture on "Femtochemistry: Atomic-Scale Dynamics of the Chemical Bond Using Ultrafast Lasers". In 1999, he received Egypt's highest state honor, the Grand Collar of the Nile. In October 2006, Zewail received the Albert Einstein World Award of Science for "his pioneering development of the new field of femtoscience and for his seminal contributions to the revolutionary discipline of physical biology, creating new ways for better understanding the functional behavior of biological systems by directly visualizing them in the four dimensions of space and time."

Other international awards include the King Faisal International Prize (1989), Wolf Prize in Chemistry (1993) awarded to him by the Wolf Foundation, the Tolman Award (1997), the Robert A. Welch Award (1997), the Golden Plate Award of the American Academy of Achievement (2000), the Othmer Gold Medal (2009), the Priestley Medal (2011) from the American Chemical Society and the Davy Medal (2011) from the Royal Society. He was elected a Fellow of the African Academy of Sciences in 2001.

Zewail became a member of the National Academy of Sciences in 1989 the American Academy of Arts and Sciences in 1993, and the American Philosophical Society in 1998. Zewail was elected a Foreign Member of the Royal Society (ForMemRS) in 2001. He was awarded an honorary doctorate from Heriot-Watt University in 2002. He was awarded an honorary doctorate by Lund University in Sweden in May 2003 and was made a Foreign Member of the Royal Swedish Academy of Sciences. Cambridge University awarded him an honorary Doctor of Science in 2006. In May 2008, Zewail received an honorary doctorate from Complutense University of Madrid. In February 2009, Zewail was awarded an honorary doctorate in arts and sciences by the University of Jordan. In May 2010, he gave the commencement address at Southwestern University. On 3 October 2011 he was awarded an honorary doctorate in science from the University of Glasgow. On 19 May 2014, he was awarded an honorary degree from Yale University. The Zewail city of science and technology, established in 2000 and revived in 2011, is named in his honour.

Honorary Degrees
Zewail was bestowed honorary degrees by the following institutions: 
University of Oxford, UK (1991); 
The American University in Cairo, Egypt (1993);
Katholieke Universiteit, Leuven, Belgium (1997);
University of Pennsylvania, USA (1997);
University of Lausanne, Switzerland (1997);
Swinburne University of Technology, Australia (1999);
Arab Academy for Science, Technology & Maritime Transport, Egypt (1999);
D.Sc. Alexandria University, Egypt (1999); 
D.Sc. University of New Brunswick, Canada (2000); 
Sapienza University of Rome, Italy (2000); and
University of Liège, Belgium (2000).

Personal life
Zewail and his first wife, Mervat, were married in 1967, just before leaving Egypt to attend the University of Philadelphia. He had two daughters with Mervat, Maha and Amani. They separated in 1979.

Zewail married Dema Faham in 1989. Zewail and Faham had two sons, Nabeel and Hani.

Honours

Egyptian national honours

Grand Collar of the Order of the Nile (1999)
Grand Cross of the Order of Merit (Egypt) (1995)

Foreign honors

Knight of the Legion of Honour
Officier of the National Order of Merit

Grand Cordon of the National Order of the Cedar

Grand Officer of the Order of the Two Niles

Commander of the Order of the Republic

Grand Officer of Order of Zayed

Death and funeral
Zewail died aged 70 on the morning of August 2, 2016. He was recovering from cancer, however, the exact cause of his death is unknown. Zewail returned to Egypt, but only his body was received at Cairo Airport. A military funeral was held for Zewail on August 7, 2016, at the El-Mosheer Tantawy mosque in Cairo, Egypt. Those attending included President Abdel Fattah el-Sisi, Prime Minister Sherif Ismail, al-Azhar Grand Imam Ahmed el-Tayeb, Defence Minister Sedki Sobhi, former President Adly Mansour, former Prime Minister Ibrahim Mahlab and heart surgeon Magdi Yacoub. The funeral prayers were led by Ali Gomaa, former Grand Mufti of Egypt.

Publications

Scientific
Advances in Laser Spectroscopy I, ed. A. H. Zewail, SPIE, Bellingham, 1977
Advances in Laser Chemistry, ed. A. H. Zewail, Springer-Verlag, Berlin-Heidelberg, 1978
Photochemistry and Photobiology, Vols. 1 and 2, ed. A. H. Zewail, Harwood Academic, London, 1983
Ultrafast Phenomena VII, eds. C. B. Harris, E. P. Ippen, G. A. Mourou and A. H. Zewail, Springer-Verlag, Berlin-Heidelberg, 1990
The Chemical Bond: Structure and Dynamics, ed. A. H. Zewail, Academic Press, Boston, 1992
Ultrafast Phenomena VIII, eds. J.-L. Martin, A. Migus, G. A. Mourou, and A. H. Zewail, Springer-Verlag, Berlin-Heidelberg, 1993
Ultrafast Phenomena IX, eds. P. F. Barbara, W. H. Knox, G. A. Mourou, and A. H. Zewail, Springer-Verlag, Berlin-Heidelberg, 1994
Femtochemistry: Ultrafast Dynamics of the Chemical Bond Vol. I, A. H. Zewail, World Scientific, 1994
Femtochemistry: Ultrafast Dynamics of the Chemical Bond Vol. II, A. H. Zewail, World Scientific, 1994
Physical Biology: From Atoms to Medicine, ed. A. H. Zewail, Imperial College Press, London, 2008
4D Electron Microscopy, ed. A. H. Zewail, Imperial College Press, London, 2009
International Advisory Board for Encyclopedia of Analytical Chemistry (1999–2014)
4D Visualization of Matter: Recent Collected Works of Ahmed H Zewail, Nobel Laureate, Imperial College Press, London, 2014

Biographical
Voyage Through Time: Walks of Life to the Nobel Prize, Ahmed H Zewail, World Scientific, 2002Age of Science'' (2005, autobiography in Arabic)

Remembering Ahmed H. Zewail

See also
Zewail City of Science and Technology (ZCST)
Ahmed founded ZCST and even donated his entire Nobel prize money in order to establish this university. Due to his need of wanting help Egypt to excel and advance academically the first batch of students were exempted from fees due to their scientific brilliance. 
List of Egyptian scientists

References

External links

Official website Captured from the Wayback Machine, June 28, 2018, accessed July 20, 2020

Interview with Ahmed Zewail Caltech Oral Histories, California Institute of Technology
 

1946 births
2016 deaths
Albert Einstein World Award of Science Laureates
Alexandria University alumni
People from Beheira Governorate
Egyptian chemists
Egyptian inventors
Egyptian scientists
Egyptian Muslims
Egyptian Nobel laureates
Egyptian emigrants to the United States
American Muslims
American Nobel laureates
American physical chemists
California Institute of Technology faculty
University of California, Berkeley fellows
Foreign Members of the Royal Society
Members of the United States National Academy of Sciences
Members of the Pontifical Academy of Sciences
Members of the Royal Swedish Academy of Sciences
Members of the French Academy of Sciences
Foreign Members of the Russian Academy of Sciences
Foreign members of the Chinese Academy of Sciences
Foreign Fellows of the Indian National Science Academy
Nobel laureates in Chemistry
Spectroscopists
University of Pennsylvania alumni
Wolf Prize in Chemistry laureates
People from Desouk
Fellows of the American Physical Society
Members of the American Philosophical Society
Fellows of the African Academy of Sciences
Recipients of orders, decorations, and medals of Sudan